The 500th Fighter-Bomber Squadron is an inactive United States Air Force unit.  Its last assignment was with the 85th Fighter-Bomber Group stationed at Harris Neck Army Air Field, 1eorgia.   It was inactivated on 1 May 1944.

History
Participated in air-ground maneuvers, October 1942— April 1943, and afterward served as a replacement training unit until 1 May 1944

Lineage
 Constituted as the 306th Bombardment Squadron (Light) on 13 January 1942
 Activated on 10 February 1942
 Redesignated 306th Bombardment Squadron (Dive) on 27 July 1942
 Redesignated 500th Fighter-Bomber Squadron on 10 August 1943
 Disbanded on 1 May 1944

Assignments
 * 85th Bombardment Group (later 85th Fighter-Bomber Group), 10 February 1942 – 1 May 1944

Stations
 Army Air Base, Savannah, Georgia, 10 February 1942
 Bowman Field, Kentucky, c. 16 February 1942
 Hunter Field, Georgia, 8 June 1942
 Waycross Army Air Field, Georgia, 15 August 1942
 Gillespie Field, Tennessee, 3 October 1942
 Blythe Army Air Base, California, 2 November 1942
 Rice Army Air Field, California, c. 11 December 1942
 Harding Army Air Field, Louisiana, c. 9 April 1943
 Waycross Army Air Field, Georgia, 23 August 1943
 Harris Neck Army Air Field, Georgia, 11 December 1943 – 1 May 1944

Aircraft
 Vultee V-72 Vengeance, 1942
 Douglas A-24 Dauntless, 1942–1943
 North American A-36 Apache, 1943
 Bell P-39 Airacobra, 1943–1944
 Curtiss P-40 Warhawk, 1944

References

Notes

Bibliography

 
 

Fighter squadrons of the United States Army Air Forces
Military units and formations disestablished in 1944